Jack Green (born 2 August 1947) is a former Australian rules footballer who played with Collingwood in the Victorian Football League (VFL).

Green, who was recruited from Broadford, was the third Jack Green to play for Collingwood. His father played 127 for Collingwood from 1938 to 1949 and his grandfather was a Collingwood premiership player.

A half back, Green made 18 appearances for Collingwood, 11 of them in the 1968 VFL season.

He later played at Preston in the Victorian Football Association.

References

1947 births
Australian rules footballers from Victoria (Australia)
Collingwood Football Club players
Living people